PSEB may refer to:

 UDP-N-acetylglucosamine 4,6-dehydratase (configuration-inverting), an enzyme
 Punjab School Education Board
 Pakistan Software Export Board 
 Punjab State Electricity Board